Small Business Economics is a peer-reviewed academic journal published by Springer Science+Business Media covering research into entrepreneurship from different disciplines, including economics, finance, management, psychology, and sociology. The editors-in-chief are Z.J. Acs (George Mason University) and D.B. Audretsch (Indiana University Bloomington).

Abstracting and indexing 
The journal is abstracted and indexed in:

According to the Journal Citation Reports, the journal has a 2017 impact factor of 2.852, ranking it in the top 20% of 245 journals in the category "Economics".

References

External links 
 

Business and management journals
Springer Science+Business Media academic journals
Quarterly journals
Publications established in 1989
English-language journals